Coventry-Eagle was a British bicycle and motorcycle manufacturer. Established as a Victorian bicycle maker, the company began under the name of Hotchkiss, Mayo & Meek.  The company name was changed to Coventry Eagle in 1897 when John Meek left the company .  By 1898 they had begun to experiment with motorised vehicles and by 1899, had produced their first motorcycle.  The motorcycles were hand built from components and finished carefully, Coventry-Eagle motorcycles proved reliable and by the First World War the range included Villiers Engineering and JAP engines.

During the early 1920s, the models changed depending on what engines were available and the company swapped between five engine manufacturers - Villiers, JAP, Sturmey-Archer, Blackburne and Matchless.  The model Flying 8 bore a resemblance to the contemporary Brough Superior.  During the depression of the 1930s, the company concentrated on producing two-strokes. Production continued until the start of the Second World War in 1939.

In the 1930s they had launched a range of sporting bikes under the "Falcon" brand. After the war, and not of a scale to continue competitive motorcycle manufacture, the company concentrated on their racing bicycles. It was under this marque that the company relaunched itself as Falcon Cycles, now a division of Tandem Group.

Models

References

External links

Coventry-Eagle gallery

Defunct cycle manufacturers of England
Defunct motorcycle manufacturers of the United Kingdom
Vintage vehicles
Defunct motor vehicle manufacturers of England
Coventry motor companies